Cai Tongtong (born February 7, 1990, in Wenzhou, Zhejiang) is a Chinese rhythmic gymnast. She won the group championships at the 2006 National Group Championships.

She represented China at the 2008 Summer Olympics and won a silver medal in the group competition.

References
 

1990 births
Living people
Chinese rhythmic gymnasts
Gymnasts at the 2008 Summer Olympics
Olympic gymnasts of China
Olympic silver medalists for China
Sportspeople from Wenzhou
Olympic medalists in gymnastics
Medalists at the 2008 Summer Olympics
Gymnasts from Zhejiang
21st-century Chinese women